Anna Rüh (born 17 June 1993 in Greifswald) is a German athlete who specialises in the discus throw.

Rüh represented Germany at the 2012 European Athletics Championships where she finished 4th in the discus event with a throw of 62.65 metres.

Achievements

References

External links 
 
 
 
 

1993 births
Living people
People from Greifswald
German female discus throwers
German female shot putters
Olympic athletes of Germany
Athletes (track and field) at the 2012 Summer Olympics
Sportspeople from Mecklenburg-Western Pomerania